Rizzato is an Italian surname. It may refer to:

Alberto Rizzato (died 1245), Italian Catholic bishop and patriarch of Antioch
Gildo Rizzato (born 1948), Italian footballer
Gala Rizzato, Italian pop singer and songwriter
Oscar Rizzato (1928–2021), Italian Catholic bishop
Romano Rizzato (born 1936), Italian painter and illustrator
Simone Rizzato (born 1981), Italian footballer